KJRC (89.9 FM) is a radio station broadcasting a Catholic format. Licensed to Rapid City, South Dakota, United States, the station serves the Rapid City area.  The station is currently owned by Real Presence Radio.

The station previously held the callsign KQFR, was an affiliate of Family Radio and was owned by Family Stations, Inc. Effective July 31, 2015, Real Presence Radio purchased the station for $200,000. At the same time, the station's callsign was changed to KJRC. KJRC became an affiliate of Real Presence Radio on August 3, 2015.

References

External links

JRC
Radio stations established in 1994
1994 establishments in South Dakota